Ismaïl Fathali (born November 3, 1958 in Béja), is a Tunisian general appointed on August 12, 2014 by former president Moncef Marzouki as Tunisian Army Chief of Staff.

References

1958 births
Living people
Tunisian generals
Tunisian military personnel
People from Béja